Benjamin Shurtleff (September 7, 1821 – December 21, 1911) was a pioneer physician in California, and later a politician in that state.

He was Born September 7, 1821 in Carver, Massachusetts to Charles Shurtleff and Hannah Shaw, Shurtleff and was educated in the public schools until the age of fifteen, and then at Pierce Academy, where he began teaching at age nineteen. He studied medicine with his brother, Dr. G.A. Shurtleff, and with Dr. Elisha Huntington, of Lowell, Massachusetts, and attended Fremont Medical School of Boston, and was taught by Dr. Oliver Wendell Holmes, Sr. Shurtleff graduated from the medical department of Harvard University in 1848.

In 1849 he traveled to California by sea, passing through the Strait of Magellan. He settled in Shasta County, where in addition to practicing medicine, he engaged in mining and owned a drug store. He was elected as the first treasurer of Shasta County, and in 1860 was elected as a state senator from that county.

In 1874, he moved to Napa, California, where he served as director of the Napa State Hospital for nineteen years, and served for many years as mayor of Napa. He was a member of the California constitutional convention of 1879.

He was a member of the Republican Party, and a Mason.

He married Anna M. B. (Griffith) Shurtleff, born in Middleboro, Massachusetts, on February 21, 1853, while on a return visit to New England. They had three sons, Benjamin E., Charles A., and George C.; the middle son, Charles A. Shurtleff, served as an Associate Justice of the Supreme Court of California. He died December 21, 1911 in Napa, at the age of 90.

References

1821 births
1911 deaths
People from Carver, Massachusetts
Harvard Medical School alumni
California pioneers
San Francisco Bay Area politicians
People from the San Francisco Bay Area
Physicians from California